Homonopsis foederatana is a species of moth of the family Tortricidae. It is found in Korea, Japan and the Russian Far East (Ussuri).

The ground colour of the forewings is pale yellowish brown.

The larvae feed on Quercus mongolica, Quercus variabilis, Abies species (including Abies alba and Abies firma), Larix, Picea, Malus pumila, Prunus x yedoensis, Pyrus pyrifolia, Salix and Taxus cuspidata.

References

Moths described in 1901
Archipini